Sudhir Bhargava was the ninth Chief Information Commissioner of India. He held the office from January 1, 2019 until his retirement on January 11, 2020.  He had been working as one of the information commissioner since June 2015. Before that he served as secretary in the Ministry of Social Justice. He was an Indian Administrative Service bureaucrat.

References

External links
 Sudhir Bhargava at Central Information Commission

Living people
Place of birth missing (living people)
Indian Administrative Service officers
1955 births